Ms. D! is a Philippine television talk show broadcast by GMA Network. Hosted by Dina Bonnevie, it premiered on November 11, 1996. The show concluded on February 26, 1999. It was replaced by D! Day in its timeslot.

References

1996 Philippine television series debuts
1999 Philippine television series endings
Filipino-language television shows
GMA Network original programming
Philippine television talk shows
Television series by Viva Television